Natasha Mannuela Halim (born May 9, 1994) is an Indonesian model, ballerina, fashion designer, architecture contractor and beauty pageant titleholder who was crowned Miss Indonesia 2016, she represented Indonesia at the Miss World 2016, where she was crowned 2nd Runner-up and Miss World Asia 2016, the highest placement for Indonesia so far.

Biography

Natasha born in Pangkal Pinang, Bangka Belitung, she has an interest in ballet, piano and been modelling since she was fifteen. She worked with a team in managing her fashion-line business LOCAPOCA in the early of 2014, by empowering women with disability to work as a creative designers. She is also managing her family business as an architecture contractor 

She graduated three and a half years with an international business from Prasetya Mulya University, Jakarta, where she graduated cum laude.

Together with MNC Group, she's taking part as an inspirational speaker on "PlayTalk: Finding Your Voice" platform for the youth. She often involves in social activities that leads her to meet people from different culture backgrounds, Her communication skill with diverse people from all over the world was simply rousing for the audience in "PlayTalk: Finding Your Voice".

Beauty Pageant

Miss Indonesia 2016
Natasha crowned Miss Indonesia 2016 as a representative of the province of Bangka Belitung Islands, at the finals held at the RCTI Studio, Kebon Jeruk, Jakarta-Indonesia, on February 24, 2016 by the outgoing titleholder of Miss Indonesia 2015 and Miss World 2015 2nd runner-up, Maria Harfanti of Yogyakarta and Miss World 2015, Mireia Lalaguna of Spain attended the awarding night.

Miss World 2016
As Miss Indonesia 2016, Natasha represented Indonesia in the 66th Miss World 2016 Pageant at the MGM National Harbor, Washington, D.C., United States.

In the finale coronation night of the contest, which was held on December 18, 2016, she was the winner of Beauty with a Purpose 2016 and the continental Miss World Asia 2016, it is the third time in a row where the country won the challenge event Beauty with a Purpose since 2014, and the second time after Maria Harfanti won the continental Miss World Asia 2015. Natasha eventually became the second runner-up of Miss World 2016, following Maria Harfanti who was also the second runner-up of previous year.

References

External links
 
Miss Indonesia Official website

1994 births
Living people
Miss World 2016 delegates
Indonesian Christians
Indonesian female models
Indonesian film actresses
Indonesian beauty pageant winners
People from Jakarta
People from Pangkal Pinang